Sabará is a Brazilian municipality located in the state of Minas Gerais. The city belongs to the Belo Horizonte metropolitan region and to the associated microregion.

It is a well preserved historic city and retains the characteristics of a baroque city, with its churches, buildings and museums.

Other historical cities in Minas Gerais are Ouro Preto, São João del-Rei, Diamantina, Mariana, Tiradentes and Congonhas.

Historic structures

Sabará is home to numerous colonial-period historic structures, many designated as Brazilian national monuments by the National Institute of Historic and Artistic Heritage (IPHAN); others are designated as state monuments or recognized as Portuguese-era monuments as Heritage of Portuguese Influence by Calouste Gulbenkian Foundation.

 Hospice of the Holy Land and Chapel of Our Lady of Pilar (Hospício da Terra Santa e Capela de Nossa Senhora do Pilar)
 Chapel of Our Lady of the Rosary (Capela de Nossa Senhora do Rosário)
 Parish Church of Our Lady of the Conception (Igreja Matriz de Nossa Senhora da Conceição)
 Church of Our Lady of Mercy (Igreja de Nossa Senhora das Mercês)
 Church of Our Lady of Mount Carmel (Igreja de Nossa Senhora do Carmo)
 Church of Our Lady of the Rosary (Igreja de Nossa Senhora do Rosário dos Pretos)
 Church of Our Lady of Ó (Igreja de Nossa Senhora do Ó)
 Church of Saint Anne (Igreja de Santana)
 Church of the Archbrotherhood of Saint Francis of Assisi (Church of the Archbrotherhood of Saint Francis of Assisi)
 Chapel of Saint Antony of Pompéu (Capela de Santo António de Pompéu)
 Chapels of the Stations of the Passion (Sabará) (Capelas dos Passos)
 Station of the Passion in Rua do Carmo (Passo do Carmo)
 Station of the Passion in Rua Marquês de Sapucaí (Station of the Passion in Rua Marquês de Sapucaí)
 Museum of Gold (Museu do Ouro, Antiga Casa de Intendência)
 Municipal Theater of Sabará (Teatro Municipal de Sabará)
 Caquende Fountain (Chafariz do Caquende)
 Rosário Fountain (Chafariz do Rosário)
 Casa Azul
 House of Padre Correia (Solar do Padre Correia)

See also
 List of municipalities in Minas Gerais (MG)

References

Municipalities in Minas Gerais
Populated places established in 1675
1675 establishments in Brazil